The New Elbe Tunnel, often simply called Elbtunnel, is a subterranean Elbe River crossing in northern Germany located in Hamburg.

Description
As a part of the Bundesautobahn 7 in Hamburg, the tunnel forms a connection between Schleswig-Holstein (and on towards Denmark) to the north and Lower Saxony to the south. It has 8 lanes in 4 bores. The newest, fourth bore is the only one to feature a hard shoulder, minimizing congestion due to broken down vehicles.

History
The tunnel was constructed from 1968 to 1975 with three bores, containing a total of six autobahn lanes serving the city of Hamburg. On 10 January 1975 the Chancellor of Germany, Helmut Schmidt, opened the Elbe Tunnel. The tunnel was constructed with a capacity for 65,000 cars daily.

In 1989 concrete tank barriers were constructed on the three south entrances. In war times these barriers would have been exploded out of their resting places. The barriers were removed in 2000 during construction of the 4th bore.

Widening
To meet the demands of increasing traffic, on 27 October 2002 a fourth bore was opened with two more lanes. It had been drilled through the ground by the then world's largest tunnel boring machine (TBM), which had a front plate 14.65 m (48 ft 1 in) in diameter. The machine's name was Trude, a short form of the name Gertrud, and an acronym for Tief runter unter die Elbe (deep down under the Elbe). The European Space Agency had helped in engineering aspects of the tunnel project for the tunnel boring machine.

The centre bores carry reversible lanes which switch direction in anticipation of commuter flows, similar to those of Caldecott Tunnel in Oakland, California. For example, more lanes are available for the morning commute into the city center in the northward direction Flensburg, and more in the southbound direction of Hanover for traffic leaving the city in the evening.

Vehicle height control
The tunnel operation office controls traffic with 72 visual monitors. Traffic lights, highway barriers and variable message signs are in use to regulate 150,000 vehicles per day.

All bores are equipped with an automated height control at each entrance. As soon as a vehicle with a height of more than 4 meters enters the tunnel, the system will stop all traffic in that lane and direction of traffic. This will ensure that overheight trucks will not damage the tunnel. The tunnel police will then direct the truck out of the tunnel so that traffic can resume.

See also 

 Old Elbe Tunnel also known as the "St. Pauli Elbtunnel"
 Bundesautobahn 7

References

 Ulrich Alexis Christiansen: Hamburgs dunkle Welten. Der geheimnisvolle Untergrund der Hansestadt. Ch.Links Verlag, Berlin 2008,  (in German)

Transport in Hamburg
Road tunnels in Germany
Buildings and structures in Altona, Hamburg
Buildings and structures in Hamburg-Mitte
Tunnels completed in 1975
Roads with a reversible lane
Undersea tunnels in Europe
1975 establishments in West Germany